Tum is a village in Kagoro chiefdom, Kaura Local Government Area in southern Kaduna State in the Middle Belt region of Nigeria. The village uses the near by post office at Kagoro.

People and language

People

The people of Tum are mainly ethnic Atyap, belonging to two subgroups, Atyap proper and Agworok.

Language

The two dialects of Tyap spoken in Tum are Tyap proper and Gworok.

Notable people
 Sen. Danjuma Laah, Entrepreneur, politician

See also
 List of villages in Kaduna State

References

Populated places in Kaduna State